Bhanu is a municipality of Tanahun District in Gandaki Province of western Nepal. The municipality was established on 19 September 2015 by merging the existing Bhanu village development committee or VDC, Barbhanjyang VDCs, Rupakot (VDC), Tanahunsur Village Development Committee, Purkot VDC, Mirlung VDC, Satiswara VDC, Risti VDC, Basantapur VDC and Chok Chisapani VDC. The center of the municipality is established in former VDC Office of Bhanu. After merging the population of all of the VDCs, it had a total population of 46,179 according to 2011 Nepal census. After the government decision the number of municipalities has reached 217 in Nepal.  Nepali poet Bhanubhakta Acharya was born in Bhanu Municipality. It was named after him.

Demographics
At the time of the 2011 Nepal census, Bhanu Municipality had a population of 46,179. Of these, 81.6% spoke Nepali, 7.5% Gurung, 3.7% Newar, 2.9% Tamang, 1.4% Urdu, 1.1% Kumhali, 1.1% Magar, 0.2% Bhojpuri, 0.1% Hindi, 0.1% Rai and 0.1% other languages as their first language.

In terms of ethnicity/caste, 25.5% were Chhetri, 11.8% Hill Brahmin, 11.4% Gurung, 10.3% Newar, 6.7% Magar, 6.5% Sarki, 6.4% Kami, 5.9% Tamang, 3.4% Damai/Dholi, 2.8% Kumal, 2.6% Musalman, 2.4% Gharti/Bhujel, 0.9% Badi, 0.8% Thakuri, 0.4% Gaine, 0.3% Majhi, 0.3% Sanyasi/Dasnami, 0.2% Bote, 0.2% Ghale, 0.2% Rai, 0.1% other Dalit, 0.1% Dura, 0.1% Hajam/Thakur, 0.1% Kamar, 0.1% Kurmi, 0.1% Yadav and 0.2% others.

In terms of religion, 83.7% were Hindu, 11.8% Buddhist, 2.6% Muslim, 1.4% Christian, 0.1% Bon and 0.3% others.

In terms of literacy, 72.8% could read and write, 1.7% could only read and 25.4% could neither read nor write.

Ward Profile 
There are 13 wards in Bhanu Municipality.

Notable Persons 
 Bhanubhakta Acharya, a famous poet of Nepal
 Govinda Raj Joshi, Nepalese politician
 Ram Chandra Poudel, Nepalese politician
 Rajendra Chhetri, Chief of Army Staff of the Nepali Army

See also 
 Tanahun District
 Gandaki Province
 Rupakot, Tanahu
 Village development committee (Nepal)
 Gandaki Zone
 Western Development Region, Nepal
 Chok Chisapani
 Risti, Nepal
 Satiswara
 Purkot
 Tanahunsur

References

Municipalities in Gandaki Province
Populated places in Tanahun District
Nepal municipalities established in 2015